Craig Cohen may refer to:
 Craig Cohen (political scientist)
 Craig Cohen (broadcaster)

See also
 Craig Cohon, London-based Canadian businessman